Elbridge Gerry (December 6, 1813 – April 10, 1886) was an American lawyer, who served as a U.S. Congressman from Maine from 1849 to 1851.

Biography
Gerry was born on December 6, 1813 in Waterford, Massachusetts (now in Maine); he was the son of Peter and Mary "Polly" (Cutler) Gerry. He attended Bridgton Academy, and studied law with Judge Stephen Emery (who also served as Maine's Attorney General).  Gerry was admitted to the bar in 1839 and established a practice in Waterford.

Gerry's father served in the Maine House of Representatives and in local offices including selectman and town meeting moderator.  Gerry also served in local offices in Waterford, including town clerk (1842-1843), and town meeting moderator (1847, 1852).

He was clerk of the Maine House of Representatives in 1840, and was appointed a United States commissioner in bankruptcy in 1841.  From 1842 to 1845 he was prosecuting attorney for Oxford County.  In 1846 he served in the Maine House of Representatives, including holding the post of Speaker Pro tempore during the absence of Speaker Ebenezer Knowlton.

He was elected to a single term in Congress as a Democrat in 1848, and served from March 4, 1849 to March 3, 1851. He did not run for reelection in 1850, and moved to Portland to continue the practice of law.

He died in Portland on April 10, 1886, and was buried at Portland's Evergreen Cemetery.

Family
In 1849, Gerry married Anna St. Clair Jenness, the daughter of Richard and Caroline Jenness of Portsmouth, New Hampshire.  They were the parents of three children: Alice, Elbridge, and Elizabeth.

Alice Gerry (1850-1921) was the wife of Arthur Melville Patterson of Baltimore, Maryland.  After his death, she married John Stewart, the grandson of David Stewart.  After her 1913 divorce, she married Francis B. Griswold.

Elbridge Gerry (1853-1907) graduated from Bowdoin College and Harvard Law School.  He practiced law in Maine and New York City before accepting appointment as vice consul in Le Havre, France in 1885.  He remained in Europe after resigning in 1887, and died in Siena, Italy.

Elizabeth Jenness Gerry (1852-1912), was the wife of Greek diplomat Constantin Pangiris.

Note
Many sources indicate that Elbridge Gerry (1813-1886) was the grandson of Elbridge Gerry (1744-1814).  This seems to be in error; the ancestry of Elbridge Gerry (1813-1886) can be traced to his father Peter (1776-1847); Peter's father Nathaniel Gerry (or Geary) (1733-1791); Nathaniel's father Thomas; Nathaniel's grandfather, also named  Thomas; and Nathaniel's great-grandfather Thomas Gery (or Gary).

References

Sources

Books

Newspapers

External links

1813 births
1886 deaths
People from Waterford, Maine
Maine lawyers
Gerry family
Politicians from Portland, Maine
Burials at Evergreen Cemetery (Portland, Maine)
Democratic Party members of the United States House of Representatives from Maine
19th-century American politicians